This is a list of early-20th-century British children's literature illustrators. It is organised by order of date of birth where shown, then alphabetically by surname.

 W. Graham Robertson (1866–1948)
 Arthur Rackham (1867–1939)
 H. R. Millar (1869–1940)
 Charles Robinson (1870–1937)
 W. Heath Robinson (1872–1944)
 Steven Spurrier (1878–1961) 
 E. H. Shepherd (1879–1976)
 Thomas Henry Fisher (1879–1962) 
 Gerald Spencer Pryse (1882–1956) 
 Evelyn Paul (1883–1963) 
 Arthur Ransome (1884–1967)
 Clifford Webb (1895–1972)
 Joyce Lankester Brisley (1896–1978)
Norah Montgomerie (1909–1998)

 Illustrators
children's literature illustrators 20th-century
Lists of 20th-century people
British literature-related lists